Paul Konrad (1 April 1877 in Le Locle – 19 December 1948 in Neuchâtel) was a Swiss geometrician and amateur mycologist.

From 1902 he was an employee of the Compagnie des Tramways de Neuchâtel, of which, he served as a director from 1938 to 1948.

In 1918 he became a member of the Société mycologique de France, and for a number of years was associated with the Société linnéenne de Lyon (1927–48). In 1932 he received an honorary doctorate in sciences from the University of Neuchâtel.

Selected writings 
 Notes critiques sur quelques champignons du Jura (4 parts, 1923–29) – Critique on some mushrooms of the Jura.
 Révision des Hyménomycètes de France et des pays limitrophes; with André Maublanc (1924) – Revision on Hymenomycetes of France and neighboring countries. 
 Icones Selectae Fungorum; with André Maublanc (6 parts, 1924–27). 
 Note sur le Boletus pulverulentus Opatowski; with René Maire (1927) – On Boletus pulverulentus. 
 Les Agaricales. Classification, revision des espèces, iconographie, comestibilité, with André Maublanc (1948) – Agaricales; classification. revision of species, iconography, edibility.
In 1949 mycologist Eugéne Mayor published Konrad's necrology in the journal "Bulletin de la Société neuchâteloise des sciences naturelles".

References 

1877 births
1948 deaths
People from Le Locle
Swiss mycologists